Dariusz Żuraw (born 14 November 1972) is a Polish football manager and former player, currently in charge of I liga club Podbeskidzie Bielsko-Biała. Besides Poland, he has played in Germany.

Club career 
Born in Wieluń, Żuraw began his career in his native Poland, playing for a succession of lower league teams: LZS Ostrówek, LZS Rychłocice, WKS Wieluń, Okocimski KS Brzesko, Zagłębie Lubin.

He was spotted by Hannover 96, then of 2. Bundesliga, and moved there on 24 October 2001, making his debut a month later on 28 November 2001 in a DFB-Pokal tie against VfL Wolfsburg II. He immediately enjoyed success, as the club won promotion, comfortably finishing as champions.

Żuraw's first game at the top level was also a memorable occasion as he scored after just 6 minutes against Hamburger SV.

He was a regular fixture in defence during his seven seasons with Hannover 96; in 2004–05, he was just one game away from being an ever-present (as suspension ruled him out).

In 2008, he transferred to the Polish Ekstraklasa club Arka Gdynia, on a free transfer from Hannover 96.

International career 
Żuraw made one appearance for the Poland national team, in a 3–1 friendly defeat to Belarus on 9 February 2005.

Managerial career 
Ahead of the 2017–18 season Żuraw took over as manager at Znicz Pruszków, newly relegated to the third-tier II liga.

From 31 March 2019 to 6 April 2021, he served as manager of Ekstraklasa club Lech Poznań.

On 6 September 2022, he was appointed manager of second-tier side Podbeskidzie Bielsko-Biała, signing a deal until June 2024.

References

External links 
 

Living people
1972 births
People from Wieluń
Sportspeople from Łódź Voivodeship
Association football defenders
Polish footballers
Poland international footballers
Ekstraklasa players
Bundesliga players
2. Bundesliga players
Zagłębie Lubin players
Hannover 96 players
Arka Gdynia players
Polish expatriate footballers
Polish expatriate sportspeople in Germany
Expatriate footballers in Germany
Polish football managers
Odra Opole managers
Lech Poznań managers
Zagłębie Lubin managers
Podbeskidzie Bielsko-Biała managers
Ekstraklasa managers
I liga managers
II liga managers